The 2003 Daytona 500, the 45th running of the event, was the first race of the 2003 NASCAR Winston Cup season, having been held on February 16 at Daytona International Speedway in Daytona Beach, Florida. 2000 NASCAR Busch Series champion Jeff Green won his second career Winston Cup pole.

Prior to the race, the drivers paid tribute by having decals on their cars in honor of the astronauts who were killed in the Space Shuttle Columbia disaster two weeks earlier, similar to the 1986 Daytona 500, in which they paid tribute to the fallen crew members of the Space Shuttle Challenger disaster. In addition, the pledge of allegiance and pre-race opening invocation given by the Reverend Hal Marchman, in his next-to-last running of the event before his retirement and subsequent death, were recited. Grammy Award-winning artist Mariah Carey then performed the national anthem.

The race ended after 109 laps when rain had begun pouring on the track. Michael Waltrip won the race for the second time in three years, giving him his third NASCAR Winston Cup win; all of his wins to that point had been in races held at Daytona. It was the first of Waltrip's two wins in 2003, both coming in restrictor plate races (he later won the EA Sports 500 at Talladega in October for his fourth and last Cup win). For the first time since 1966, the race was stopped due to rain; at 272.5 miles, it had been the shortest Daytona 500 ever.

During lap 58 into the race, Ryan Newman had an accident in the tri-oval, where his No. 12 Dodge tumbled end-over-end onto the track's infield grass, but he was not injured in the crash.

This is the first Daytona 500 event that respected Winston Cup veteran Dave Marcis did not attempt since 1967, a whole season before he had started driving.

Race summary
The green flag came nearly half an hour earlier than planned, due to the impending rain showers which officials feared would lead to the race having to be completed on another day. Jeff Green was out in front at the start of the race, but he was quickly passed by Michael Waltrip who led the first 34 laps. On lap 42, the race's first caution came out after Bobby Labonte spun out entering the backstretch. Dale Earnhardt Jr. took the lead from Tony Stewart as the field raced back to the caution. The first round of green flag pit stops came on lap 50.

On lap 58 Ryan Newman was running in the Top 15, but defending Daytona 500 champion Ward Burton hit Ken Schrader and both he and Newman hit the wall. The rear tire fixture underneath Newman's car detached from the car as he went sliding into the infield grass, and the No.12 went airborne and when it landed, its right-rear wheel dug into the dirt, causing Newman to flip several times before landing on its roof. Most of the car came apart in the infield, but Newman was uninjured and was able to walk away from the crash. Following Newman's flip, there were six caution laps, during which a light rain began to fall, so the race was red-flagged when the rain became heavier.

Following a rain delay which lasted over an hour, the race restarted with Michael Waltrip back in front. The race remained under the green flag until lap 95, when Jeff Green and Jimmy Spencer collided entering turn 4, bringing out a third caution. Spencer ended up hitting the frontstretch retaining wall and coming to rest just past the start-finish line. Spencer had a very similar crash in the 2000 race. A caution came on lap 103 for debris, and then Ward Burton hit the turn 4 wall on lap 106, bringing out another. There were three yellow flag laps after Burton's crash, and the race was once red-flagged again due to more rain. Although it briefly looked as if the race would get back underway, the race was eventually called off due to the forecast of more rain and Michael Waltrip was declared as the winner. It was his third career Winston Cup win both overall and at Daytona, and his second career Daytona 500 win. Coincidentally, Waltrip's first three wins came in the first three Daytona races broadcast by Fox.

This was the third Daytona 500 to have been shortened by rain, following the races held in 1965 and 1966. At 272.5 miles and 109 lap, this race was also the shortest Daytona 500 ever.

Results 
W = Past winner of the Daytona 500;
R = Daytona 500/NASCAR Winston Cup Series Rookie

Withdrew: No. 84 – Norm Benning.

References

Daytona 500
Daytona 500
NASCAR races at Daytona International Speedway
February 2003 sports events in the United States